Taborenta, Mauretania Caesariensis was a Berber civitas (town) and bishopric in Roman North Africa. It disappeared during the 7th century, and is assumed to be near Saida in modern Algeria. It was nominally restored in 1933 as a titular see.

History 
Taborenta was among the many towns in the Roman province of Mauretania Caesariensis of sufficient importance to become a suffragan diocese of Carthage, but completely faded, possibly at the 7th century advent of Islam. It is tentatively identified with the ruins near Saida in modern Algeria.

The only historically recorded bishop of this African diocese, Victor, took part in the Council of Carthage called in 484 by king Huneric of the Vandal Kingdom, after which he was exiled like most Catholic bishops, unlike their Donatist heretical-schismatic counterparts.

Titular see 
Taborenta diocese was nominally restored  in 1933 as Latin titular bishopric of Taborenta (Latin = Curiate Italian) / Taborenten(sis) (Latin adjective), 

The titular see has been assigned to:
 Bishop Jean-Baptiste-Adrien Llosa (1966.07.26 – resigned 1971.02.18)
 Bishop Wolfgang Rolly (1972.06.05 – death 2008.03.25)
 Archbishop Martin Krebs (German)

See also 
 List of Catholic dioceses in Algeria
 Catholic Church in Algeria

References

Sources and external links 
 GCatholic - (former and) titular see - consulted 22 May 2017
 catholic-hierarchy.org - flawed
 Bibliography
 Pius Bonifacius Gams, Series episcoporum Ecclesiae Catholicae, Leipzig 1931, p. 468
 Stefano Antonio Morcelli, Africa christiana, Volume I, Brescia 1816, p. 293

Catholic titular sees in Africa
Suppressed Roman Catholic dioceses
Archaeological sites in Algeria
Roman towns and cities in Algeria
Former populated places in Algeria
Ancient Berber cities
Coloniae (Roman)